The Clipper gas field is a major natural gas reservoir and gas production facility in the UK sector of the southern North Sea. The field is located about 73 km north-north-east of Bacton, Norfolk; the Clipper production facility has operated since 1990.

The fields 
The Clipper field was discovered by Shell in March 1968 in Block 48/19a, part of the Sole Pit area. The gas reservoir is a Lower Permian Leman Sandstone Formation. The field is jointly owned by ESSO E&P UK Ltd (50 %) and Shell UK Ltd (50 %). The field was anticipated to have recoverable reserves of 22.5 billion cubic metres (bcm).

In addition to Clipper, the adjacent fields produced natural gas to the Clipper facility. 

note 1. Reserves are in billion cubic metres (bcm).

The Clipper, Barque, Galleon, Cutter, Carrack, and Skiff fields are named after sailing vessels. 

Clipper South was owned by RWE Dea UK (50%), Fairfield Energy (25%), and Bayern Gas (25%). RWE Dea and Fairfield sold their interests to Ineos in 2015. The field is owned by Ineos and Spirit Energy.

Development 
The Clipper field was developed by Shell as a central 3-platform bridge linked complex. Three further bridge-linked platforms were added later. In addition to its own gas, Clipper was designed to be a central hub to receive and process well fluids from the surrounding installations. Processed gas was transmitted by pipeline from Clipper to the Bacton Gas Terminal, Norfolk. The main design parameters of the Clipper area installations are summarized in the table.   

Gas from Clipper South was originally routed to the ConocoPhillips LOGGS installation thence to Theddlethorpe gas terminal (TGT). When TGT closed in August 2018 a new pipeline was installed to route gas from Clipper South to Clipper.

As part of the Clipper development new pipeline reception facilities and process plant was installed at the Shell terminal at the Bacton gas terminal.

Gas production 
Production facilities on the Clipper complex include bulk liquid removal, 5 centrifugal two-stage compression with a capacity of 2 x 200 MMSCFD (million standard cubic feet per day).

Gas production from Clipper and the connected fields is summarised in the table, data includes the peak rate and the cumulative production over the period 1990 to 2014. 

The production profile, in mcm/y, of the Clipper field was as shown.

The production profile, in mcm/y, of the Barque field was as shown.

See also 

 Bacton gas terminal
 List of oil and gas fields of the North Sea 
 West Sole gas field
 Lincolnshire Offshore Gas Gathering System

References 

Natural gas fields in the United Kingdom
North Sea energy